Sir Michael Anthony John Ferguson CBE, FRS, FRSE (born February 1957) is a British biochemist and Regius Professor of Life Sciences at the University of Dundee. His research team are based at the School of Life Sciences, University of Dundee.

Career

He was awarded a BSc degree in biochemistry by the University of Manchester Institute of Science and Technology in 1979 and a PhD degree in biochemistry by London University in 1982.

He was a postdoctoral fellow at the Rockefeller University, New York (1982–85) and at Oxford University (1985–88). He then accepted a lectureship at the University of Dundee and was promoted to Professor of Molecular Parasitology in 1994. He became Dean of Research for the School of Life Sciences at the University of Dundee in 2007, a position he held until 2014. He was a member of the board of governors of the Wellcome Trust (2012–2021), also serving as Deputy Chair (2018–2021).

He is a member of the board of directors of the Medicines for Malaria Venture.

Honours and awards
1991: awarded Colworth Medal by the Biochemical Society to "the most promising young biochemist under 35"
1993-98: Howard Hughes International Research Scholarship
1994: elected a fellow of the Royal Society of Edinburgh
1996: awarded Makdougall Brisbane Prize of the Royal Society of Edinburgh for "particular distinction in the promotion of scientific research".
1999: International Glycoconjugate Organisation Award. A biennial award made to "a scientist who has clearly advanced the field of glycoscience and shows promise of continuing advancements".
1999: elected a member of The European Molecular Biology Organisation).
2000: elected a Fellow of The Royal Society (London).
2006: awarded the C.A. Wright Medal of the British Society for Parasitology.
2007: elected a Fellow of The Academy of Medical Sciences
2008: invested Commander of the Order of the British Empire (CBE) for services to science.
2012: appointed a member of the Board of Governors of The Wellcome Trust
2013: appointed Regius Professor of Life Sciences
2019: invested Knight Bachelor for services to science.

References

Living people
1957 births
Alumni of the University of Manchester
Alumni of the University of London
Fellows of the Royal Society
Commanders of the Order of the British Empire
Knights Bachelor
British biochemists
Scientists from County Durham
Fellows of the Royal Society of Edinburgh
Academics of the University of Dundee